Alexander Singer (born 18 April 1928, in New York City, New York, died 28 December 2020) was an American director. He began his career behind the camera in 1951 as a cinematographer on the short documentary Day of the Fight, directed by his high-school friend Stanley Kubrick. Singer turned to directing a decade later with the film A Cold Wind in August.

Although he directed other films, such as the Lee Van Cleef Western Captain Apache (1971), and Glass Houses (1972), an adaptation of a book that his wife Judith Singer wrote, the bulk of Singer's credits are in television. The long list of series to which Singer has lent his directorial talents include Dr. Kildare, The F.B.I., Mission: Impossible, Alias Smith and Jones, Nakia, Police Woman, Cagney & Lacey, MacGyver, six episodes of The Monkees, and three Star Trek series: The Next Generation, Deep Space Nine, and Voyager.

References

External links

1928 births
2020 deaths
American film directors
American television directors
People from New York City